Francis Joseph may refer to:
 Franz Joseph I of Austria (1830–1916), Emperor of Austria, Apostolic King of Hungary and King of Bohemia
 Francis Joseph, Duke of Guise (1670–1675), French Duke of Guise and Joyeuse and Prince of Joinville
 Prince Francis Joseph of Braganza (1879–1919), Portuguese royal
 Francis Joseph (footballer) (1960–2022), English professional footballer
 Francis L'Estrange Joseph (1870–1951), British industrialist

See also
Franz Joseph (disambiguation)
 Joseph Francis (disambiguation)